Darren Tierney is a British civil servant currently serving as the director-general heading the Cabinet Office's propriety and ethics team.

Tierney joined the civil service in 2007, joining the Ministry of Justice where he held various roles including as Principal Private Secretary to the Lord Chancellor, Kenneth Clarke, and as director for youth justice policy. He then briefly worked for the Cabinet Office as director for civil service efficiency in 2015, returning to the Ministry of Justice as interim director-general of prison policy in 2016 for a few months. From 2016 until 2019, Tierney worked as the new Department for International Trade's director of strategy. He was promoted to serve from 2019 as the director-general responsible for global trade and investment.

He returned to the Cabinet Office in 2021, taking over from outgoing Deputy Cabinet Secretary Helen MacNamara in the part of her role as overseeing propriety and ethics across the UK government. His predecessor but one in this role, Sue Gray, is working with him for the investigation into the Westminster Christmas parties controversy.

Offices held

References

External links 

 

Living people
British civil servants
Civil servants in the Cabinet Office
Year of birth missing (living people)